Acta Mathematica Hungarica is a peer-reviewed mathematics journal of the Hungarian Academy of Sciences, published by Akadémiai Kiadó and Springer Science+Business Media. The journal was established in 1950 and publishes articles on mathematics related to work by Hungarian mathematicians. 

Its 2009 MCQ was 0.39, and its 2015 impact factor was 0.469. The editor-in-chief is Imre Bárány, honorary editor is Ákos Császár, the editors are the mathematician members of the Hungarian Academy of Sciences.

Abstracting and indexing
According to the Journal Citation Reports, the journal had a 2021 impact factor of 0.979. This journal is indexed by the following services:

 Science Citation Index 
 Journal Citation Reports/Science Edition 
 Scopus
 Mathematical Reviews
 Zentralblatt Math

References

External links

Mathematics journals
Publications established in 1950
English-language journals
Springer Science+Business Media academic journals
1950 establishments in Hungary
Akadémiai Kiadó academic journals